The 1876 United States presidential election in New York took place on November 7, 1876. All contemporary 38 states were part of the 1876 United States presidential election. Voters chose 35 electors to the Electoral College, which selected the president and vice president.

New York was won by the Democratic nominees, Governor Samuel J. Tilden of New York and his running mate former Senator and Governor Thomas A. Hendricks of Indiana. Tilden and Hendricks defeated the Republican nominees, Governor Rutherford B. Hayes of Ohio and his running mate Congressman William A. Wheeler of New York.

Tilden carried New York State with 51.40% of the vote to Hayes's 48.17%, a victory margin of 3.23%.

New York weighed in for this election as less than 1% more Democratic than the national average.

While Tilden won his home state's 35 electoral votes, he ultimately narrowly lost his quest for the presidency in the electoral college by just one electoral vote, amidst heavily disputed election results, despite winning a majority of the nationwide popular vote by a 51–48 margin.

Tilden performed most strongly downstate in the New York City area, where he received more than 60% of the vote in New York County and Richmond County, and also won Kings County and Queens County. Tilden also won nearby Suffolk County, Westchester County, and Rockland County. Hayes won much of upstate New York, including a victory in Erie County, home to the city of Buffalo, although Tilden did win a fair number of upstate counties including Albany County, home to the state capital of Albany.

This would be the final time New York would vote for a losing presidential candidate until it voted for Charles Evans Hughes over Woodrow Wilson in 1916. This would also be the last time the state voted for a losing Democratic presidential candidate until it voted for Hubert Humphrey over Richard Nixon in 1968.

Results

See also
 United States presidential elections in New York
 Presidency of Rutherford B. Hayes

References

New York
1876
1876 New York (state) elections